The 2013–14 Cleveland State Vikings women's basketball team represented Cleveland State University in the 2013–14 NCAA Division I women's basketball season. Their head coach was Kate Peterson Abiad. The Vikings played their home games at the Wolstein Center and were members of the Horizon League. It was the 41st season of Cleveland State women's basketball. Last year they finished the season 13–17, 5–11 in Horizon League play to finish tied for sixth overall.

Preseason

Regular season

Roster

Schedule

Rankings

References

Cleveland State
Cleveland State Vikings women's basketball seasons